Siyabonga Ngezana (born 15 July 1997) is a South African soccer player who plays as a defender for Kaizer Chiefs. He has also played international football for the South Africa national team.

References

1997 births
Living people
South African soccer players
People from Sebokeng
Soccer players from Gauteng
Association football defenders
Kaizer Chiefs F.C. players
South African Premier Division players
South Africa international soccer players